Richard Leonard (born September 2, 1991) is a professional gridiron football defensive back for the Hamilton Tiger-Cats of the Canadian Football League (CFL). He played college football at FIU. He signed as an undrafted free agent with the Houston Texans in 2016.

High school career
Leonard attended Miami Killian High School, where he holds records in football and track and field.

College career
Leonard committed to FIU on September 30, 2009. With the Panthers, he starred as both a cornerback and kick returner. He was named a first-team All-Conference USA selection at cornerback and punt returner.

Professional career

Houston Texans
Leonard was not selected in the 2016 NFL Draft and signed a contract as an undrafted free agent with the Houston Texans on May 5, 2016. Leonard would suffer an injured hamstring and was waived on July 20, 2016. The Texans would release Leonard with an injury settlement on August 11, 2016.

Hamilton Tiger Cats
On May 25, 2017, Leonard signed with the Hamilton Tiger-Cats of the Canadian Football League. Leonard would go on to have an impressive rookie season with the Tiger Cats, recording 72 tackles, 7 interceptions and returned a blocked field goal for a touchdown in his first game against the Toronto Argonauts. Leonard was named an East Division All-Star for 2017. He started 18 games at cornerback for the Tiger-Cats. He was named the team's Most Outstanding Rookie. Overall, he played in three seasons for the Tiger-Cats and appeared in 49 regular season games, recording 178 defensive tackles, 31 pass knockdowns, and 12 interceptions.

Calgary Stampeders
Upon becoming a free agent on February 11, 2020, Leonard signed with the Calgary Stampeders. He re-signed with the team on December 14, 2020. He became a free agent upon the expiry of his contract on February 8, 2022.

Hamilton Tiger-Cats (II)
On February 8, 2022, it was announced that Leonard had signed with the Hamilton Tiger-Cats.

Personal
Leonard has a cousin, Jeremiah McKinnon, who currently plays cornerback for the New York Giants.

References

1991 births
Living people
Miami Killian Senior High School alumni
American football cornerbacks
American players of Canadian football
FIU Panthers football players
Players of American football from Miami
Houston Texans players
Hamilton Tiger-Cats players
Calgary Stampeders players
Canadian football defensive backs
Players of Canadian football from Miami